This is a glossary of terms used within the  Catholic Church. Some terms used in everyday English have a different meaning in the context of the Catholic faith, including brother, confession, confirmation, exemption, faithful, father, ordinary, religious, sister, venerable, and vow.

A
 Abbess — the female head of a community of nuns (abbey)
 Abbot — the male head of a community of monks (monastery)
 Acolyte 
 Actual grace 
 Ad limina visits — visit by diocesan bishop to the Holy See, usually every five years
 Alexandrian Rite
 Altar
 Altar server 
 Altarage — the revenue reserved for the chaplain (altarist or altar-thane) in contradistinction to the income of the parish priest, it came to signify the fees received by a priest from the laity when discharging any function for them
 Ambo 
 Ambry 
 Amovibility
 Annulment – see: Declaration of Nullity (below)
 Apostolic administrator
 Apostolic Chancery — a former office of the Roman Curia
 Apostolic life, Society of — see: Society of apostolic life (below)
 Apostolic nuncio — see: Nuncio (below)
 Apostolic prefect 
 Apostolic succession 
 Apostolic vicar 
 Apse 
 Archbishop — the bishop of an archdiocese, with limited jurisdiction over his suffragan sees; a titular and largely honorary designation granted to certain bishops, often Nuncios and other members of the Holy See diplomatic corps
 Archpriest (Latin Church) — see: Vicar Forane (below)
 Auxiliary bishopB
 Baptism 
 Baptism of Jesus 
 Baptismal font 
 Beatification 
 Bishop  — an ordained minister who holds the fullness of the sacrament of Holy Orders and is responsible for teaching the Catholic faith, ruling the Church, and sanctifying her people.
 Bishop emeritus  (or Archbishop emeritus) — the title given to a retired bishop or archbishop
 Bishops' conference — see: Episcopal conference (below) Blessed (beatified person) — see: Beatification (above) Brother  — a male lay member of a Catholic religious institute
 Byzantine Rite

C
 Canon law 
 Cardinal 
 Cardinal Vicar 
 Catholicism  - the body of the Catholic faith, its theologies and doctrines, its liturgical, ethical, spiritual, and behavioural characteristics, as well as a religious people as a whole.
 Catechism  - a document containing an approved exposition of Church teachings
 Chancery, Apostolic — see: Apostolic Chancery (above) Chancery, Diocesan – see: Diocesan chancery (below) Chaplain of His Holiness
 Clergy, Regular – see: Regular clergy (below) Clergy, Secular – see: Secular clergy (below) Coadjutor bishop — an auxiliary bishop with the legal right of succession to the see of which he is coadjutor
 Code of Canon Law, 1917
 Code of Canon Law, 1983
 Code of Canons of the Eastern Churches 
 College of Cardinals 
 College of Consultors 
 Communion - see: Eucharist (below) and Full communion (below) Communion rite
 Communion of Saints 
 Conclave
 Confession – see: Sacrament of Penance (below) Confirmation 
 Congregation, Religious 
 Congregation (Roman Curia)
 Congregation, Sacred – see: Congregation (Roman Curia) (above) Consecrated life 
 Consecrated life (Catholic Church) 
 Consecrated life, Institute of – see: Institute of consecrated life (below) Corpus Juris Canonici Council, Pontifical – see: Pontifical Council (below)
 Counter-Reformation  - the period of Catholic revival beginning with the Council of Trent and ending at the close of the Thirty Years' War.
 Credence table 
 Crosier 
 Crucifix 
 Curia, Moderator of the - see: Moderator of the Curia (below)
 Curia 
 Curia, Roman - see: Roman Curia (below)

D
 Deacon 
 Dean — see: Vicar forane (below)
 Declaration of Nullity — a canonical judicial sentence declaring that the matrimonial covenant was invalid from the beginning due to impediments or defect of consent
 Definitor 
 Diaconate — see: Deacon (above)
 Dicastery 
 Diocesan administrator 
 Diocesan bishop 
 Diocesan chancery 
 Diocesan curia — see: "Curia (Roman Catholic Church)" (above)
 Divine Liturgy 
 Diocesan priest 
 Diocesan tribunal — see: Tribunal (below)
 Discalceation Dulia — see also: Hyperdulia (below)

E
 East–West Schism  - forcibly divided medieval Christianity's Eastern (Greek) from its Western (Latin) jurisdiction, which later became known as the Eastern Orthodox Church and the Roman Catholic Church, respectively
 Eastern Catholic Churches 
 East Syriac Rite Ecclesiastical judge 
 Eminence – see: His Eminence (below)
 Encyclical 
 Eparchy 
 Episcopal conference 
 Episcopal see 
 Episcopal vicar 
 Eucharist  - a Christian sacrament, generally considered to be a commemoration of the Last Supper, in which Jesus Christ shared his Body and Blood with his disciples before his betrayal and crucifixion
 Exarch Excardination — see also: Incardination
 Excitator - the excitator in seminaries, monasteries and convents was the person charged with the job of awakening community members each morning.
 Exclaustration Excommunication  - a medicinal religious penalty that bars the person from reception of the sacraments, the rights of office, and other privileges in the Church
 Exemption 
 Exorcism  - the practice of expelling demons from a person, place, or thing which they are believed to possess or inhabit

F
 Faithful — the collective members of the church incorporated into it through sacramental baptism.
 Fall of Man — the willful transition of the first humans from a state of original holiness, in communion with God, to a state of guilt and perennial disobedience
 Family wage 
 Father (cleric) — a traditional title of priests
 Father, God the — a name for the First Person of the Blessed Trinity
 Five Ways — see: Quinque Viæ (below)
 Font, Baptismal — see: Baptismal font (above)
 Font, Holy water — see: Holy water font (below)
 Friar Full communionG
 Grace (Christianity) 
 Grace (prayer)H
 Hierarchy His Eminence His Holiness  Holy Communion – see: Eucharist (above)
 Holy Orders 
 Holy See – the episcopal jurisdiction of the Bishop of Rome (who is commonly known as the Pope), and is the preeminent episcopal see of the Catholic Church, forming the central government of the Church
 Holy water font (or stoup)  (church)
 Holy water stoup (home) – see: Home stoup (below)
 Home stoup 
 Honorary Prelate Horarium – the schedule of daily prayers for those living in a religious community or seminary. See also Liturgy of the Hours.
 Hyperdulia – veneration of the Blessed Virgin Mary see also: dulia
 Hypostasis – in Jesus Christ, the union of two natures, divine and human, in the one divine person of the Son of God

I
 Immaculate Conception — the dogma that Mary was conceived without original sin (not to be confused with the Incarnation of Christ)
 Incardination — see also: excardination (above)
 Incarnation — The Word of God taking on a human nature and becoming true man, Jesus Christ (not to be confused with the Immaculate Conception of Mary)
 Institute of consecrated life 
 Institute, Religious — see: Religious institute (below)
 Institute, Secular — see: Secular institute (below)

J
 Judicial vicar Just War doctrine Jesus
 Jehovahs Witnesses

L
 Laity 
 Lapsed Catholic — a Catholic who has ceased practising the Catholic faith.
 Latin Church 
 Latin liturgical rites Law, canon — see: Canon law (above)
 Lay communion — the status of a cleric who is in communion with the Church, but only with the standing of a lay person.
 Lay ecclesial ministry 
 Lectio Divina 
 Lectionary 
 Lector — see: Reader (below)
 Limbo  — an idea of speculative theology about the afterlife condition of those unbaptized who die in Original Sin rather than assigning them to the Hell of the damned. Limbo is not a formally defined doctrine of the Catholic Church
 Latria — worship and prayer owed to God alone
 Liturgy  — public worship
 Local ordinaryM
 Mass — the usual English-language name for the Eucharistic celebration in the Latin liturgical rites of the Catholic Church
 Mariology — the theology concerned with the Virgin Mary, the mother of Jesus Christ
 Mediatrix — the role of the Blessed Virgin Mary as a mediator in the salvation process
 Metropolitan archbishop 
 Military ordinariate 
 Missal 
 Missal, Roman — see: Roman Missal (below)
 Mission sui juris 
 Mitre 
 Monk 
 Monsignor Most Holy Trinity — see:Trinity (below)

N
 Narthex 
 Nave 
 Novitiate 
 Nun  — see also: Sister (below)
 NuncioO
 Officialis — see: Judicial vicar (above)
 Order, Religious — see: Religious order (below)
 Ordinariate, Military — see: Military ordinariate (above)
 Ordinariate, Personal — see: Personal ordinariate (below)
 Ordinary — see: Local ordinary (above)

P
 Papal court 
 Parish Pastor 
 Patriarch Patriarchate Penance – see: Sacrament of Penance (below)
 Permanent deacon – see: Deacon (above)
 Personal ordinariate 
 Personal prelature 
 Pew 
 Pontiff 
 Pontifical Council Pope Prefect apostolic – see: Apostolic prefect (above)
 Prelate Prelate, Honorary – see: Honorary Prelate (above)
 Prelature, Personal – see: Personal prelature (above)
 Prelature, Territorial – see: Territorial prelature (below)
 Priest Priest, Diocesan – see: Diocesan priest (above)
 Priest, Religious – see: Regular clergy (below)
 Prior 
 Prioress 
 Protonotary apostolic 
 Pulpit – see: Ambo (above)

Q
 Quinque Viæ — Aquinas' famous philosophical proofs for the existence of God found in his Summa Theologiæ

R
 Ratum sed non consummatum Reader Reconciliation – see: Sacrament of Penance (below)
 Rector  (cathedral or seminary)
 Regular clergy Religious Religious brother – see: Brother (above)
 Religious congregation – see: Congregation, Religious (above)
 Religious institute (Catholic) Religious order Religious priest – see: Regular clergy (above)
 Rite to Being - The rite of being left alone to pray to Jesus Christ
 Religious sister – see: Sister (below)
 Right of Option  - a way of obtaining a benefice or a title, by the choice of the new titulary
 Roman Catholic  - The Roman rite of the Catholic Church. 
 Roman Curia — "the complex of dicasteries and institutes that help the Roman Pontiff in the exercise of his supreme pastoral function for the good and service of the whole Church and of the particular Churches"
 Roman MissalS
 Sacrament of Penance  - commonly called Confession, Reconciliation or Penance, becoming free of sin by confession and repentance
 Sacred congregation – see: Congregation (Roman Curia) (above)
 Sacred Tradition Saints, Communion of – see: Communion of Saints (above)
 Sanctifying grace – see: Grace (Christianity) (above)
 Sanctuary Secular clergy Secular institute Sede vacante See, Episcopal - see: Episcopal see (above)
 Seminarian Server – see: Altar server (above)
 Side altar Simple vow – any vow which is not a solemn vow
 Sister Society of apostolic life Solemn vow Stoup, Holy water – see: Holy water font (above) and Home stoup (above)
 Summa Theologiæ — a theological work by Thomas Aquinas
 Supreme Pontiff – see: Pontiff (above)

T
 Territorial prelature 
 Titular bishop 
 Titular church 
 Tradition, Sacred – see: Sacred Tradition (above)
 Transept 
 Transitional deacon'see: Deacon (above)
 Transubstantiation 
 Tribunal – an ecclesiastical court 
 Trinity, The

V
 Vacant see — see: Sede vacante (above)
 Venerable 
 Vatican (disambiguation) 
 Vicar apostolic — see: Apostolic vicar (above)
 Vicar forane — also known as "dean" or, in the Latin Church, "archpriest"
 Vicar general 
 Vicar, judicial — see: Judicial vicar (above)
 Vicar of Christ 
 Vow — see: Simple vow (above) or Solemn vow (above)

U
 Universal Church

W
 Wage, Family — see: Family wage (above)
 War, just — see: Just war (above)
 Ways, Five — see: Quinque Viæ(above)
 West Syriac Rite

See also
 Catholic Encyclopedia

References

Works cited
 

Catholic terminology
Catholic Church
Wikipedia glossaries using unordered lists